West Ishpeming is an unincorporated community in Marquette County in the U.S. state of Michigan. It is also a census-designated place (CDP) for statistical purposes and has no legal status as an incorporated municipality. The population was 2,552 at the 2020 census.  The community is located mostly within Ishpeming Township with a small portion extending south into Tilden Township.  The city of Ishpeming borders to the east.

Geography

Demographics

As of the census of 2000, there were 2,792 people, 1,043 households, and 804 families residing in the community. The racial makeup of the community was 98.50% White, 0.18% African American, 0.14% Native American, 0.25% Asian, 0.18% from other races, and 0.75% from two or more races. Hispanic or Latino of any race were 0.50% of the population.

There were 1,043 households, out of which 33.7% had children under the age of 18 living with them, 65.7% were married couples living together, 8.0% had a female householder with no husband present, and 22.9% were non-families. 19.8% of all households were made up of individuals, and 8.7% had someone living alone who was 65 years of age or older.  The average household size was 2.57 and the average family size was 2.95.

In the community, the population was spread out, with 23.1% under the age of 18, 8.2% from 18 to 24, 23.9% from 25 to 44, 27.5% from 45 to 64, and 17.3% who were 65 years of age or older.  The median age was 42 years. For every 100 females, there were 92.6 males.  For every 100 females age 18 and over, there were 92.6 males.

The median income for a household in the community was $41,758, and the median income for a family was $47,500. Males had a median income of $40,523 versus $22,448 for females. The per capita income for the community was $16,928.  About 6.8% of families and 7.5% of the population were below the poverty line, including 13.4% of those under age 18 and 2.2% of those age 65 or over.

References

Unincorporated communities in Marquette County, Michigan
Census-designated places in Michigan
Unincorporated communities in Michigan
Census-designated places in Marquette County, Michigan